Aegoprepes is a genus of beetles in the family Cerambycidae, containing the following species:

 Aegoprepes affinis Breuning, 1948
 Aegoprepes antennator Pascoe, 1871

References

Agapanthiini
Cerambycidae genera